The 5th Washington D.C. Area Film Critics Association Awards, honoring the best in filmmaking in 2006, were given on December 11, 2006.

Winners
 Best Actor
 Forest Whitaker – The Last King of Scotland
 Best Actress
 Helen Mirren – The Queen
 Best Animated Feature
 Happy Feet
 Best Art Direction
 Marie Antoinette
 Best Breakthrough Performance
 Jennifer Hudson – Dreamgirls
 Best Cast
 Little Miss Sunshine
 Best Director
 Martin Scorsese – The Departed
 Best Documentary Feature
 An Inconvenient Truth
 Best Film
 United 93
 Best Foreign Language Film
 El laberinto del fauno (Pan's Labyrinth), Mexico/Spain/United States
 Best Screenplay – Adapted
 Thank You for Smoking – Jason Reitman Best Screenplay – Original Little Miss Sunshine – Michael Arndt Best Supporting Actor Djimon Hounsou – Blood Diamond
 Best Supporting Actress
 Jennifer Hudson – Dreamgirls

References

External links
 The Washington D.C. Area Film Critics Association

2006 film awards
2006